Byron Black defeated Rainer Schüttler 6–4, 1–6, 6–3 to win the 1999 Chennai Open singles event. Patrick Rafter was the defending champion but did not defend his title.

Seeds

Draw

Finals

Section 1

Section 2

External links
 1999 Chennai Open Singles draw

1999 Gold Flake Open
Maharashtra Open